Philip Johnson is a former professional rugby league footballer who played in the 1960s, 1970s, 1980s and 1990s.

Playing career

County honours
Philip Johnson won a cap playing as an interchange/substitute for Yorkshire while at Castleford in the 19-16 victory over Lancashire at Castleford's stadium on 12 September 1978.

County Cup Final appearances
Philip Johnson played left-, i.e. number 4, in Castleford's 17-7 victory over Featherstone Rovers in the 1977 Yorkshire County Cup Final during the 1977–78 season at Headingley Rugby Stadium, Leeds on Saturday 15 October 1977.

BBC2 Floodlit Trophy Final appearances
Philip Johnson played left-, i.e. number 4, in Castleford's 12-4 victory over Leigh in the 1976 BBC2 Floodlit Trophy Final during the 1976–77 season at Hilton Park, Leigh on Tuesday 14 December 1976.

Player's No.6 Trophy Final appearances
Philip Johnson played left-, i.e. number 4, and scored a try in Castleford's 25-15 victory over Blackpool Borough in the 1976–77 Player's No.6 Trophy Final during the 1976–77 season at The Willows, Salford on Saturday 22 January 1977.

Club career
Philip Johnson made his début for Featherstone Rovers on Sunday 22 August 1982, through injury, he  did not play in Featherstone Rovers' 14-12 victory over Hull F.C. in the 1983 Challenge Cup Final during the 1982–83 season at Wembley Stadium, London on Saturday 7 May 1983, and he played his last match for Featherstone Rovers during the 1983–84 season.

Testimonial match
Philip Johnson's Testimonial match at Castleford took place in 1980.

References

Living people
Castleford Tigers players
English rugby league players
Featherstone Rovers players
Leigh Leopards players
Place of birth missing (living people)
Rugby league centres
Rugby league five-eighths
Rugby league fullbacks
Rugby league players from Yorkshire
Year of birth missing (living people)
Yorkshire rugby league team players